"Banana Pancake Trail" or "Banana Pancake Circuit" is the name given to growing routes around Southeast Asia, and to some extent South Asia, travelled by backpackers and other tourists. The Trail has no clear geographical definition, but is used as a metaphor for places that are popular among Western tourists.

Etymology

The phrase "Banana Pancake Trail" is usually used tongue-in-cheek as an affectionate nickname for various routes in Southeast Asia and South Asia, and many reference guesthouses, cafes and restaurants catering to backpackers and serving banana pancakes as a form of sweet breakfast or snack.

The Banana Pancake Trail is sometimes associated with backpackers who use Lonely Planet travel guides, with these books often being the most used by backpackers on these routes. Banana Pancake trails materialise when an influx of Western backpackers to an area leads to a rise in the number of restaurants serving food adapted to Western desires which includes banana pancakes and other Western comfort foods such as yogurt with muesli and honey.

Geographical reach

There is no firm geographical definition of the Banana Pancake Trail, as it is a metaphor to describe the ever-developing travellers' trails in South Asia and Southeast Asia, rather than an actual route or road (much like the Silk Road is not a single road). However, the phrase is used to describe, amongst others, the locations below:

South Asia
Nepal: 
Pokhara, Thamel in Kathmandu, Everest Base Camp

India:
Goa, Pushkar, Varanasi, Jaisalmer, Kerala, Dharamkot / Upper Bhagsu, Old Manali / Vashisht, Auli, Mussoorie, Dhanaulti

Sri Lanka: 
Kandy, Sigiriya, Galle, Polonnaruwa, Nuwara Eliya

Southeast Asia
Myanmar:
Yangon, Bagan, Inle Lake, Hpa-An, Pyin Oo Lwin

Thailand:
Bangkok (with its famous Khao San Road), Chiang Mai, Pai, Kanchanaburi, Krabi, and many of the islands, including Phuket, Ko Tao, Ko Pha Ngan (with its world-infamous Full Moon Party), Ko Phi Phi, Koh Lipe, and Koh Chang

Laos:
Vang Vieng, Luang Prabang, Nong Khiaw, Bolaven Plateau, Si Phan Don (The 4000 Islands)

Cambodia:
Siem Reap (home to Angkor Wat), Sihanoukville and its offshore islands, Battambang, Phnom Penh, Kampot

Vietnam:
Ho Chi Minh City, Dalat, Mui Ne, Nha Trang, Hoi An, Huế, Hanoi, Halong Bay, Sa Pa

Indonesia: Bali, Gili Islands, Nusa Penida, Lombok, Yogyakarta, Mount Bromo

Philippines: Banaue, Sagada, Boracay, Cebu, Bohol, El Nido, Coron, Siargao

The most common route passes through Vietnam, Cambodia and Thailand from Bangkok to Ho Chi Minh City via Siem Reap and Angkor Wat, as well as Phnom Penh and the Mekong Delta. Also people go north from Bangkok to Chiang Mai and hill-tribe villages, continuing to Luang Prabang and Vang Vieng in Laos. Also many head from Ho Chi Minh City to Hanoi, via popular stops being Hoi An and Huế.

Similar trails
The Banana Pancake Trail is similar in idea to the "Gringo Trail" in South America, the "Hippie Trail" in Europe and South Asia in the 1960s–70s, and the "Hummus trail" in India popularized by Israeli travelers traveling after their military service.

See also
Grand Tour – 17th–19th century Continental tour undertaken by young European aristocrats, partly as leisure and partly educational.

References

External links

Chennai Tax Office and the Trail of the Banana Pancake by Colin Todhunter

Backpacking
Hiking trails in Asia
Tourism in Southeast Asia